Jonatan Kopelev (or Yehonatan, ; born 1 October 1991) is an Israeli swimmer. He competes in 100 m backstroke, 200 m backstroke, and 50 m backstroke. He won a gold medal in the 50 m backstroke at the 2012 European Aquatics Championships.

Early and personal life
Kopelev began swimming at age seven, at the Maccabi Haifa Carmel club. He and his wife Monada live in Haifa, Israel.

Swimming career
His club is Maccabi Haifa. Kopelev competes in 100 m backstroke, 200 m backstroke, and 50 m backstroke.

Kopelev won a gold medal in the 50 metre backstroke at the 2012 European Aquatics Championships in Debrecen, Hungary. In doing so he became the first Israeli swimmer to win a gold medal at the European championships. He qualified for the 2012 Olympics, swimming a 54.38 in the 100 m backstroke in a competition in Slovenia in June 2012, but was unable to compete in the Games due to an appendectomy.

Kopelev came in eighth in the men’s 50 m backstroke  at the 2013 World Aquatics Championships, with a lifetime best of 24.73.

In July 2016 he posted the fastest time in 2016 for the men’s 50 m backstroke with a time of 24.60, also setting a new Israeli record.

In December 2018 Kopelev came in second in the 50 S backstroke in the Israel International Arena Winter Championship with a time of 24.25.

Kopelev competed for Israel at the 2019 World Aquatics Championships.

See also
List of Israeli records in swimming

References

External links
 The-sports.org
Instagram page

1991 births
Living people
Israeli male swimmers
Male backstroke swimmers
European Aquatics Championships medalists in swimming
Sportspeople from Haifa
Israeli people of Russian-Jewish descent